The Colisée Desjardins, formerly the Colisée des Bois-Francs, is a 3,420 capacity multi-purpose arena in Victoriaville, Quebec, Canada. It is home to the Victoriaville Tigres ice hockey team. The arena was built in 1980 and is also known as the Amphithéatre Gilbert-Perreault. Naming rights to the building were sold to the Desjardins Group in 2006.

External links 
 Les Tigres de Victoriaville 

Indoor ice hockey venues in Quebec
Indoor arenas in Quebec
Quebec Major Junior Hockey League arenas
Sports venues in Quebec
Sport in Victoriaville
Buildings and structures in Centre-du-Québec
Desjardins Group